Nibley is a city in Cache County, Utah,  United States. Incorporated in 1935, it was named after Charles W. Nibley, a leader in the Church of Jesus Christ of Latter-day Saints. The population was 5,438 at the 2010 census. It is included in the Logan, Utah-Idaho (partial) Metropolitan Statistical Area and is a suburb or 'bedroom' community of Logan.

Historically a rural area, Nibley has experienced significant growth within the last decade, more than doubling its population in under 10 years.

Geography
Nibley lies between the cities of Hyrum and Logan in the Cache Valley.

According to the United States Census Bureau, the city has a total area of 4.03 square miles, 10.4377 square kilometers, all land.

Heritage Days

Nibley celebrates many events in the city that have drawn the community closer. They have an Easter egg hunt, a live nativity, and other holiday celebrations yearly. The most notable holiday celebration is Heritage Days.

"In 1984, Mayor Leishman called a committee together to organize a celebration for the city inviting all current and former residents of Nibley to join in the celebration. They decided to meet on a Saturday in June and called it Heritage Days. It was such a success that it was made an annual event."  It has been held every year since that time and continues to grow each year.
 
Currently Heritage Days is held annually on the week of the fourth Saturday of June.  Each year there is a parade made up of Nibley residents and other local business and organizations. Other events include a Mayor's Dinner, a five kilometer foot race, the Children's Theater, a petting zoo, dunking machine, bake off, beauty pageant, baby contest and other fun family events.

Demographics

As of the census of 2000, there were 2,045 people, 566 households, and 516 families residing in the city. The racial makeup of the city was 96.67% White, 0.15% Native American, 0.39% Asian, 0.15% Pacific Islander, 1.27% from other races, and 1.37% from two or more races. Hispanic or Latino of any race were 3.86% of the population.

There were 566 households, out of which 59.4% had children under the age of 18 living with them, 84.5% were married couples living together, 5.8% had a female householder with no husband present, and 8.8% were non-families. 7.6% of all households were made up of individuals, and 2.8% had someone living alone who was 65 years of age or older. The average household size was 3.61 and the average family size was 3.82.

In the city, the population was spread out, with 38.4% under the age of 18, 10.4% from 18 to 24, 28.5% from 25 to 44, 18.2% from 45 to 64, and 4.4% who were 65 years of age or older. The median age was 26 years. For every 100 females, there were 103.3 males. For every 100 females age 18 and over, there were 99.8 males.

The median income for a household in the city was $52,273, and the median income for a family was $54,896. Males had a median income of $39,156 versus $21,463 for females. The per capita income for the city was $17,168. About 1.3% of families and 1.1% of the population were below the poverty line, including 1.1% of those under age 18 and none of those age 65 or over.

2010 Census

In the 2010 census, Nibley had a population of 5,540 people, and 1,351 households. Nibley City's population and households have more than doubled from 2000 to 2010. The population density was 1,350.7 people per square mile. The racial makeup of the city was 87.5% White; .2% Black; .5% American Indian and Alaska Native; .5% Asian; .2% Native Hawaiian and other Pacific Islander; 1.7% reporting two or more races; and 10.1% Hispanic or Latino.

Out of 1,351 households in Nibley 60.5% had children under the age of 18 living with them, 87.0% were married couples living together, 4.4% had a female householder with no husband present, 2.0% had a male household with no wife present, and 6.6% of household were nonfamily households. 6.0% of all households were made up of individuals, and 1.6% had someone living alone who was 65 years of age or older. The average household size was 3.75 people and the average family size was 3.92 people.

Forty-five point seven percent of the population was 0–19 years old; 4.4% were 20–24; 32.0% were 25–44; 13.6% were 45–64; and 4.3% were 65 and older.  The median age was 24.8 and the city was 50.3% female.

The median household income was $63,423, while the mean household income was $69,168.  The median family income was $65,104, and the mean family income was $70, 174. The per capita income for the city was $18,644. From 2007 to 2011 the percentage of people below the poverty level was 2.8% compared to the State of Utah average of 11.4%.

See also

 List of cities and towns in Utah

References

External links

 

Cities in Cache County, Utah
Cities in Utah
Logan metropolitan area
1937 establishments in Utah
Populated places established in 1937